Sean Paterson (born 25 March 1987 in Greenock, Inverclyde) is a Scottish former professional footballer.

Career
Paterson was on the books of Blackpool between 2004 and 2007 and during that time played two league games for the Seasiders, after being top scorer in the reserves for 2 seasons. In 2005, he went on loan to Lancaster City and he also went on loan to Southport, then playing in the Conference National, for one month in October 2006 and again from January to May 2007.

He was released by Blackpool on 31 May 2007 and in July he signed for North West Counties Football League Division Two club, Kirkham & Wesham, which later became AFC Fylde.He was top scorer in his 1st season and also took the Man of the Match award home from Wembley in the FA Vase final against Lowestoft Town on 11 May 2008 in a 2–1 victory.

References

External links

1987 births
Living people
Scottish footballers
Holker Old Boys A.F.C. players
Blackpool F.C. players
Lancaster City F.C. players
Southport F.C. players
AFC Fylde players
Burscough F.C. players
Footballers from Greenock
Association football forwards
English Football League players
National League (English football) players
North West Counties Football League players